The word chemistry derives from the word alchemy, which is found in various forms in European languages. Alchemy derives from the Arabic word kimiya or al-kīmiyāʾ.
However, the ultimate origin of the  word is uncertain.
According to the Oxford English Dictionary, al-kīmiyāʾ may be derived from the greek , which is derived from the ancient Egyptian name of Egypt, khem or khm, khame, or khmi, meaning "blackness", i.e., the rich dark soil of the Nile river valley. Therefore, alchemy can be seen as the "Egyptian art" or the "black art".

Overview
There are two main views on the derivation of the Greek word.  According to one, the word comes from the greek χημεία, pouring, infusion, used in connexion with the study of the juices of plants, and thence extended to chemical manipulations in general; this derivation accounts for the old-fashioned spellings "chymist" and "chymistry". The other view traces it to khem or khame, hieroglyph khmi, which denotes black earth as opposed to barren sand, and occurs in Plutarch as χημεία; on this derivation alchemy is explained as meaning the "Egyptian art". The first occurrence of the word is said to be in a treatise of Julius Firmicus, an astrological writer of the 4th century, but the prefix al there must be the addition of a later Arabic copyist.  In English, Piers Plowman (1362) contains the phrase "experimentis of alconomye", with variants "alkenemye" and " alknamye". The prefix al began to be dropped about the middle of the 16th century (further details of which are given below).

Egyptian origin
According to the Egyptologist Wallis Budge, the Arabic word al-kīmiyaʾ actually means "the Egyptian [science]", borrowing from the Coptic word for "Egypt", kēme (or its equivalent in the Mediaeval Bohairic dialect of Coptic, khēme). This Coptic word derives from Demotic kmỉ, itself from ancient Egyptian kmt. The ancient Egyptian word referred to both the country and the colour "black" (Egypt was the "Black Land", by contrast with the "Red Land", the surrounding desert); so this etymology could also explain the nickname "Egyptian black arts". However, according to Mahn, this theory may be an example of folk etymology. Assuming an Egyptian origin, chemistry is defined as follows:

Chemistry, from the ancient Egyptian word "khēmia" meaning transmutation of earth, is the science of matter at the atomic to molecular scale, dealing primarily with  collections of atoms, such as molecules, crystals, and metals.

Thus, according to Budge and others, chemistry derives from an Egyptian word khemein or khēmia, "preparation of black powder", ultimately derived from the name khem, Egypt. A decree of Diocletian, written about 300 AD in Greek, speaks against "the ancient writings of the Egyptians, which treat of the khēmia transmutation of gold and silver".

Greek origin
Arabic al-kīmiyaʾ or al-khīmiyaʾ ( or ), according to some, is thought to derive from the Koine Greek word khymeia meaning "the art of alloying metals, alchemy"; in the manuscripts, this word is also written khēmeia or kheimeia, which is the probable basis of the Arabic form. According to Mahn, the Greek word χυμεία khumeia originally meant "cast together", "casting together", "weld", "alloy", etc. (cf. Gk. kheein "to pour"; khuma, "that which is poured out, an ingot"). Assuming a Greek origin, chemistry is defined as follows:

Chemistry, from the Greek word  (khēmeia) meaning "cast together" or "pour together", is the science of matter at the atomic to molecular scale, dealing primarily with  collections of atoms, such as molecules, crystals, and metals.

From alchemy to chemistry
Later medieval Latin had alchimia / alchymia "alchemy", alchimicus "alchemical", and alchimista "alchemist". The mineralogist and humanist Georg Agricola (died 1555) was the first to drop the Arabic definite article al-.  In his Latin works from 1530 on he exclusively wrote chymia and chymista in describing activity that we today would characterize as chemical or alchemical. As a humanist, Agricola was intent on purifying words and returning them to their classical roots. He had no intent to make a semantic distinction between chymia and alchymia.

During the later sixteenth century Agricola's new coinage slowly propagated. It seems to have been adopted in most of the vernacular European languages following Conrad Gessner's adoption of it in his extremely popular pseudonymous work, Thesaurus Euonymi Philiatri De remediis secretis: Liber physicus, medicus, et partim etiam chymicus (Zurich 1552).  Gessner's work was frequently re-published in the second half of the 16th century in Latin and was also published in a number of vernacular European languages, with the word spelled without the al-.

In the 16th and 17th centuries in Europe the forms alchimia and chimia (and chymia) were synonymous and interchangeable. The semantic distinction between a rational and practical science of chimia and an occult alchimia arose only in the early eighteenth century.

In 16th, 17th and early 18th century English the spellings — both with and without the "al" — were usually with an i or y as in chimic / chymic / alchimic / alchymic. During the later 18th century the spelling was re-fashioned to use a letter e, as in chemic in English. In English after the spelling shifted from chimical to chemical, there was corresponding shift from alchimical to alchemical, which occurred in the early 19th century. In French, Italian, Spanish and Russian today it continues to be spelled with an i as in for example Italian chimica.

See also
History of chemistry
History of science
History of thermodynamics
List of Arabic loanwords in English
List of chemical element name etymologies

References

Chemistry
History of chemistry
Chemistry